The 1992–93 Iowa State Cyclones men's basketball team represented Iowa State University during the 1992–93 NCAA Division I men's basketball season. The Cyclones were coached by Johnny Orr, who was in his 13th season. They played their home games at Hilton Coliseum in Ames, Iowa.

They finished the season 20–11, 8–6 in Big Eight play to finish tied for second place. Their 23 wins were a school record at the time.  They lost to seventh-seeded Missouri in the 1993 Big Eight conference tournament semifinals. The Cyclones qualified for the 1993 NCAA Division I men's basketball tournament, losing to UCLA, 81–70 in the West Regional first round.

Games were televised by ESPN, Raycom Sports, Prime Sports, CBS, the Cyclone Television Network and the Hawkeye Television Network.

Previous season 
The previous season the Cyclones finished the season 21–13, 5–9 in Big Eight play to finish tied for sixth place.  They defeated Missouri in the 1992 Big Eight conference tournament quarterfinals before losing to Oklahoma State, 69–60. They would qualify for the 1991-92 NCAA men's basketball tournament, defeating UNC Charlotte 76–74 in the first round, before losing to Kentucky in the second round, 106–98.

Roster

Schedule and results 

|-
!colspan=6 style=""|Regular Season

|-

|-
!colspan=6 style=""|Exhibition

|-
!colspan=6 style=""|Regular Season

|-

|-

|-

|-

|-

|-

|-

|-

|-
!colspan=6 style=""|Exhibition

|-
!colspan=6 style=""|Regular Season

|-

|-

|-

|-

|-

|-

|-

|-

|-

|-

|-

|-

|-

|-

|-

|-

|-
!colspan=6 style=""|Big Eight tournament
|-

|-

|-
!colspan=6 style=""|NCAA Tournament
|-

Awards and honors 

All-Big Eight Selections

Justus Thigpen (1st) 
Ron Bayless (2nd) 
Fred Hoiberg (HM)

Academic All-Big Eight

Fred Hoiberg
Julius Michalik

Ralph Olsen Award

Justus Thigpen

References 

Iowa State Cyclones men's basketball seasons
Iowa State
Iowa State Cyc
Iowa State Cyc
Iowa State